Czekanowski's minnow (Rhynchocypris czekanowskii) is an Asian species of small freshwater cyprinid fish. It is found in Russia, China, Korea, and Mongolia.

References

Rhynchocypris
Freshwater fish of China
Fish of Korea
Fish of Mongolia
Fish of Russia
Fauna of Siberia
Fish described in 1869